Bohdan Bandura (born 30 January 1960 in Kiselyovsk, Soviet Union) is a former Soviet and Ukrainian professional football midfielder and current Ukrainian coach.

Career
Bandura is better known for obtaining promotion for Hazovyk-Skala Stryi to the First League and later becoming the first coach of a new FC Lviv.

References

External links
 

1960 births
Living people
People from Kiselyovsk
Soviet footballers
Ukrainian footballers
NK Veres Rivne players
SKA Lviv players
FC SKA-Karpaty Lviv players
FC Karpaty Lviv players
FC Skala Stryi (1911) players
FC Lviv (1992) players
Ukrainian First League players
Ukrainian Second League players
Association football forwards
Ukrainian football managers
FC Karpaty-2 Lviv managers
FC Hazovyk-Skala Stryi managers
FC Lviv managers